Tetraprenyl-β-curcumene synthase (EC 4.2.3.130, ytpB (gene)) is an enzyme with systematic name all-trans-heptaprenyl-diphosphate diphosphate-lyase (cyclizing, tetraprenyl-β-curcumene-forming). This enzyme catalyses the following chemical reaction

 all-trans-heptaprenyl diphosphate  tetraprenyl-β-curcumene + diphosphate

This enzyme is isolated from Bacillus subtilis.

References

External links 
 

EC 4.2.3